
Gmina Lubsko is an urban-rural gmina (administrative district) in Żary County, Lubusz Voivodeship, in western Poland.

Villages
Apart from the town of Lubsko, Gmina Lubsko contains the villages and settlements of Białków, Chełm Żarski, Chocicz, Chocimek, Dąbrowa, Dłużek, Dłużek-Kolonia, Gareja, Górzyn, Gozdno, Grabków, Janowice, Kałek, Lutol, Małowice, Mierków, Mokra, Nowiniec, Osiek, Raszyn, Stara Woda, Tarnów, Tuchola Duża, Tuchola Mała, Tuchola Żarska, Tymienice and Ziębikowo.

Neighbouring gminas
Gmina Lubsko is bordered by the gminas of Bobrowice, Brody, Gubin, Jasień, Nowogród Bobrzański and Tuplice.

Twin towns – sister cities

Gmina Lubsko is twinned with:

 Brody, Poland
 Forst, Germany
 Gribskov, Denmark
 Masny, France
 Pavlohrad, Ukraine
 Vlotho, Germany

References

Lubsko
Żary County